Maurice Doyle (born 17 October 1969) is an English former footballer.

Career
Doyle began playing football at the age of 9, began playing football for Polygon and then Princess Villa in the Ellesmere Port League. He was given a trial at Crewe Alexandra, where he began his professional career as a trainee, along with Rob Jones and Craig Hignett. He made his senior debut in 1988. He signed for Queens Park Rangers for £80,000 in 1989, where he spent six seasons but failed to become a first-team regular, playing only six times in the league for Rangers. He made his most first team appearances at his next club, Millwall, after a £25,000 move.

After being released by Millwall at the end of the 1997-98 season, he had a trial at Shrewsbury Town but was only offered a month-long contract. Instead, he dropped into non-league with Telford United, where he played until 2000.

Doyle later played for several clubs since in the Welsh Premier League and English non-league. He was later player-manager of Cheshire-based amateur club Castrol Social, winning the Pyke Cup in 2008. Doyle can now be often found playing for Queens Park Rangers in the Football Masters.

References

1969 births
Living people
People from Ellesmere Port
Sportspeople from Cheshire
English footballers
Association football midfielders
Crewe Alexandra F.C. players
Queens Park Rangers F.C. players
Wolverhampton Wanderers F.C. players
Millwall F.C. players
Shrewsbury Town F.C. players
Telford United F.C. players
The New Saints F.C. players
Oswestry Town F.C. players
Premier League players
English Football League players
Cymru Premier players